Hinrichs is a German surname. Notable people with the surname include:

Carl Hinrichs (1907–1967), German actor
Denise Hinrichs (born 1987), German shot putter
Dutch Hinrichs (1889–1972), American baseball player
Fabian Hinrichs (born 1976), German actor
Gustav Hinrichs (1850–1942), German-born American composer and conductor
Gustavus Detlef Hinrichs (1836–1923), German chemist
Hermann Friedrich Wilhelm Hinrichs (1794–1861), German philosopher
John Hinrichs (1936–2012), American mechanical engineer
John Honeycutt Hinrichs (1904–1990), United States Army general and 20th Chief of Ordnance, U.S. Army
Joseph Hinrichs (born 1966), American businessman
Lars Hinrichs (born 1976), German businessman
Paul Hinrichs (born 1925), American baseball player
Ursula Hinrichs (born 1935), German actress

See also
Johann von Hinrichs (1752–1834), Prussian military officer
Hinrich
Henrique (disambiguation)

German-language surnames